Brooke D'Orsay (born February 17, 1982) is a Canadian actress, best known for voicing the character of Caitlin Cooke on the Teletoon animated series 6teen (2004–2010) and Brooke Mayo in the 2005 movie King's Ransom.

For American audiences, she is best known as Paige Collins-Lawson on Royal Pains and as Kate in Two and a Half Men. She played 
Deb on the Lifetime original series Drop Dead Diva and was in the Nickelodeon original movie The Boy Who Cried Werewolf as Paulina Von Eckberg. Since 2017, D'Orsay has become known for her performances in Hallmark Channel's Countdown to Christmas made-for-TV films. She also acted in a 2012 movie How to Fall in Love as Anni, a broke waitress/event planner who helps a high school friend as a 'dating coach' and falls in love in the process.

Early life
Brooke D'Orsay was born on February 17, 1982, in Toronto, Ontario. The D'Orsay family name is of Huguenot French origin.

Career
Her first major acting role was in 2001, in the movie Why Can't I Be a Movie Star? as Jennifer Kruz. D'Orsay followed with several roles in television: Ellen in Doc, Justine in Soul Food and Felicity Fury in four episodes of Ace Lightning.

D'Orsay voiced Caitlin Cooke on the Teletoon animated series 6teen. She appeared on The Big Bang Theory as Christy in the episode "The Dumpling Paradox" and How I Met Your Mother as Margaret in the episode "The Stinsons". D'Orsay was the "Nestea Girl" in a long-running commercial for Nestea's "Nestea Plunge" campaign. She had a main role on Gary Unmarried as Sasha, the head boss of the sports radio network in which the series takes place.

D'Orsay played Deb Dobkins, the dead model, in the Lifetime series Drop Dead Diva and was a cast member on the USA Network series Royal Pains as Paige Collins, wife of HankMed CFO Evan R. Lawson. She also starred in the Nickelodeon original movie The Boy Who Cried Werewolf (2010) as Paulina Von Eckberg and played Kate, Walden Schmidt's girlfriend, in a recurring role on Two and a Half Men in 2012–2014.

Filmography

Film

Television

References

External links
 

1982 births
Actresses from Toronto
Canadian film actresses
Canadian television actresses
Canadian voice actresses
Living people
21st-century Canadian actresses